The 1911 Kentucky gubernatorial election was held on November 7, 1911. Democratic nominee James B. McCreary defeated Republican nominee Edward C. O'Rear with 52.01% of the vote.

General election

Candidates
Major party candidates
James B. McCreary, Democratic
Edward C. O'Rear, Republican 

Other candidates
Walter B. Lanfersiek, Socialist
J. D. Rodd, Prohibition
James H. Arnold, Socialist Labor
S. M. Payton, Independent

Results

References

1911
Kentucky
1911 Kentucky elections